

Administrative districts

The five administrative subdivisions mentioned on some web pages are just statistical divisions, without any administrative relevance:

The "Other Islands" are mainly the islands south of Tortola (separated from it by the Sir Francis Drake Channel and southwest of Virgin Gorda and detached Ginger Island, mainly Norman Island, Peter Island, Cooper Island and Salt Island. These islands are also known under the informal name Little Sisters or Southern Islands.

The present-day Administrative Districts of the British Virgin Islands were established since 2003, following the provisions of the Sister Islands Programme, 2003.

Tortola, the surrounding islets, and the Little Sisters/Southern Islands are directly administered by the BVI Government, as an "Island". The 3 "Sister Islands", including the neighbouring islets, are administered through 3 Districts, run by District Officers, under the Deputy Governor of the BVI "in order to monitor, promote and facilitate the delivery of Government services to the sister islands of Virgin Gorda, Anegada, and Jost Van Dyke". This administrative setting is similar to that of some existing or former British dependencies - The Bahamas, Turks and Caicos Islands, or the Cook Islands - among others.

The Sister Islands Programme, 2003, establishes a Coordinator which works with, and supervises the District Officers, as a liaison with the central government. 
There are no local government structures in the Territory.

Civil registry districts

There are six Civil Registry Districts in the British Virgin Islands:

Civil Registry Districts C, D and E are subdivisions of the main island Tortola.

Electoral districts
By the Constitution and Elections Ordinance 1954, which established a new Legislative Council with an elected majority, the presidency was divided into five districts. Road Town District (area of the capital) sent two members to the legislative council, the other districts one each.
A new constitution of 1967 provided for seven electoral districts, with one representative per district.
In 1977, the number of electoral districts was augmented to nine. Each electoral district sends a member to the Legislative Council, which has 13 seats (including four at large members).

References

External links
Citypopulation: Statistics or Districts
about Civil Registry Districts
about electoral districts
history of electoral districts

Geography of the British Virgin Islands
Government of the British Virgin Islands
British Virgin Islands, Districts
British Virgin Islands
British Virgin Islands-related lists